Njeri is a name from the Kikuyu tribe in Kenya. It can be a surname or a Kenyan feminine given name. Notable people with the name include:

 Itabari Njeri (21st century), American journalist

Kenyan names